The 2020 Asian Boys' U18 Volleyball Championship was originally to be the 13th edition of the Asian Boys' U18 Volleyball Championship, a biennial international volleyball tournament organised by the Asian Volleyball Confederation (AVC) with Islamic Republic of Iran Volleyball Federation (IRIVF). The tournament was scheduled to be held in Shiraz, Iran from 9 to 16 January 2021. It was originally scheduled to take place in Riffa, Bahrain from 7 to 14 July 2020, but was postponed to 2021 due to the COVID-19 pandemic.

On 14 December 2020, AVC announced that the tournament which was originally the AVC qualifier for the 2021 FIVB Volleyball Boys' U19 World Championship was canceled due to COVID-19 pandemic and the top four teams of the 2018 Asian Boys' U18 Volleyball Championship which had not yet qualified to the 2021 U19 World Championship qualified for the 2021 U19 World Championship as the AVC representatives.

See also
2020 Asian Girls' U17 Volleyball Championship

References

External links
Regulations

2020
Asian Boys' U18 Championship
Asian Boys' U18 Championship
Asian Boys' U18 Championship, 2020
2020 in Bahraini sport
2021 in Iranian sport
January 2021 sports events in Asia
Asian Boys' U18 Volleyball Championship